Islam bin Ahmed bin Shuaib Hawsawi (born 27 December 2001) is a Saudi Arabian professional footballer who plays as a left back for Saudi Professional League club Al-Wehda.

Career
Hawsawi made his senior debut for Al-Wehda at the 2021 AFC Champions League, coming on as a substitute against Iraqi club Al-Quwa Al-Jawiya.

Career statistics

Club

Notes

References

External links
 
 

2001 births
Living people
Sportspeople from Mecca
Saudi Arabian footballers
Association football fullbacks
Al-Wehda Club (Mecca) players
Saudi Professional League players
Saudi First Division League players